The 1959 Hong Kong Urban Council election was held on 3 March 1959 for the four of the eight elected seats of the Urban Council of Hong Kong. The turnout rate dropped to 30.7 per cent but there were still 7,236 of the 23,584 eligible voters cast their votes, 5,354 ballots from Hong Kong Island and 1,882 from Kowloon. Ernest Charles Wong, chairman of the Tung Wah Group of Hospitals won a seat for the Hong Kong Civic Association of which Philip Au of the Reform Club of Hong Kong retired from, while the other three Club incumbents were re-elected.

Results

Citations

References
 Lau, Y.W. (2002). A history of the municipal councils of Hong Kong : 1883-1999 : from the Sanitary Board to the Urban Council and the Regional Council. Leisure and Cultural Service Dept. 
 Pepper, Suzanne (2008). Keeping Democracy at Bay:Hong Kong and the Challenge of Chinese Political Reform. Rowman & Littlefield.

Hong Kong
1959 in Hong Kong
Urban
March 1959 events in Asia
1959 elections in the British Empire